Ptomaphagus is a genus of small carrion beetles in the family Leiodidae. There are at least 50 described species in Ptomaphagus.

ITIS Taxonomic note:
Although Ptomaphagus is sometimes attributed to Illiger 1798, Bouchard et al. (2011:173) attribute it to Hellwig 1795.

Species

References

Further reading

 
 
 
 
 
 
 
 

Leiodidae